William Watt may refer to:

 William Watt (athlete) (1886–1957), Irish Olympic athlete
 William Watt (Australian politician) (1871–1946), Premier of Victoria and Speaker of the House of Representatives
 William Watt (journalist), journalist working for the Blackpool Gazette
 William Watt (miner) (1828–1878), California Gold Rush mining executive and California politician
 William Watt (missionary) (1843–1926), Scottish missionary to the New Hebrides
 William Hogg Watt (1818–1893), Member of Parliament in the Manawatu region of New Zealand
 W. Montgomery Watt (1909–2006), Scottish historian and professor of Arabic and Islamic Studies
 William Redfern Watt (1813–1894), New South Wales politician
 Willie Watt (footballer, born 1861), Scottish footballer
 Willie Watt (footballer, born 1946), Scottish footballer
 Willie Watt (golfer) (1889–1954), Scottish golfer
 Willie Watt (Batman Beyond), a character from the animated series Batman Beyond

See also
William Watts (disambiguation)